Gossypioides kirkii is a species of flowering plant in the family Malvaceae, known from Mozambique, Kenya, Tanzania and South Africa.

This is the type species for this genus.

Synonyms
 Gossypioides kirkii (Mast.) J.B.Hutch., New Phytol. 46:132. 1947
 Gossypium kirkii Mast., J. Linn. Soc., Bot. 19:214. 1882.

References

Gossypieae
Flora of Africa
Flora of South Africa
Flora of Mozambique
Flora of Kenya
Flora of Tanzania
Plants described in 1947